Burrell Communications Group L.L.C. is an American advertising agency whose assignments are among those tracked by The New York Times. Founded by chairman emeritus Thomas (Tom) J. Burrell, and headquartered in Chicago, IL, Burrell Communications is one of the largest multi-cultural marketing firms in the world. Some of the company's work is part of a collection in the Library of Congress.

History
Burrell Communications was founded in 1971, by Tom Burrell and then partner, Emmett McBain, and was originally named Burrell McBain. When McBain left in 1974, Burrell renamed the agency Burrell Communications Group.

The company had been established to forge an authentic and respectful relationship with the African-American consumer, and to tap into how the black aesthetic could also appeal to the general market consumer. It was at this time that Burrell coined the phrase, "Black people are not dark-skinned white people." Recognizing that there existed inherent cultural differences, and the fact that these differences drove patterns of consumption, became a driving force and inspiration for future ad campaigns at Burrell. They had established a leading shop for niche African American -focused communications, beginning with the Black Marlboro Man for Philip Morris. Their list of accounts quickly expanded to include marquee brands McDonald's and Coca-Cola.
A Coke commercial entitled "Street Song" won Burrell its first Clio Award.  By 1979, Burrell topped $10 million in billing per annum,  making it one of the most successful multi-cultural advertising shops in the United States.

Other accounts they added included Martell Cognac  and Stroh's accounts (1981-1983). Burrell's "Double Dutch" Commercial for McDonald's gained national attention and a Gold Award at the U.S. Television Commercials Festival. By 1996 agency billing climbed to $20 million. To better serve Coca Cola Burrell opened an office in Atlanta, GA. More work came from Procter and Gamble, Crest Toothpaste, Polaroid and Kraft Foods Stovetop Dressing.

The agency was awarded the Grand Effie by the American Marketing Association for its work on "Who Wants," a spot created for the Partnership for a Drug Free America.  Burrell garners new clients including Nynex, Mobil,  Nabisco's A1 Steak Sauce,  Maxwell House Coffee and Sears. Agency billing tops a record-breaking $128 million. Burrell acquires DFA Communications, a general market advertising and direct marketing agency based in New York, adding direct marketing expertise as well as a New York presence.

49% sold to fund expansion
In 1999 they sold a 49% minority stake to French media giant Publicis Groupe in order to fund its expansion. Burrell Communications was awarded projects by Toyota, Hewlett-Packard and General Mills.

21st century
In 2002 Burrell was named Black Enterprise's Advertising Agency of the Year 

Tom Burrell retired in 2004. The agency launched Toyota Camry's in 2007 with their "If Looks Could Kill," the first digital campaign of its kind to target African American women. In 2009 they were granted the American Airlines account, and a Toyota ad was on the Super Bowl.

2010s
2010--Burrell launches Threshold Nation, a subsidiary dedicated to marketing toward the multi-ethnic urban male.

2011—Burrell Communications is named Black Enterprise's Advertising Agency of the Year  and adds Comcast to its list of clients

2013—Burrell launches Rising Tide, a Tide-sponsored aspirational social network for millennials looking for professional access. The program features hip-hop media mogul, Russell Simmons, sharing his wisdom with the young, professional audience.

2014—Burrell scores a major win the 2013 Toyota Avalon "Only The Name Remains" campaign, starring Academy-Award nominee Idris Elba. The campaign won a Gold National ADDY Award, an Official Webby Award Honoree, and was listed as the FWA Site of the Day.

Clients and Awards
Some among their list of major clients have been using their services for over 30 years, among which are:
McDonald's, Comcast, Procter and Gamble, General Mills, SuperValu, American Airlines, Toyota, Lilly and Disney's Dreamers Academy. They've won major industry awards, including the Clio and a Grand Effie.

See also
 UWG Inc. (Uniworld Group)

References

Advertising agencies of the United States
Marketing companies established in 1971
Companies based in Chicago
1971 establishments in Illinois